Prateep Polphantin (born 16 July 1926) is a Thai former sports shooter. He competed in the 25 metre pistol event at the 1960 Summer Olympics and 1962 Asian Games.

References

External links
  

1926 births
Possibly living people
Prateep Polphantin
Prateep Polphantin
Shooters at the 1960 Summer Olympics
Prateep Polphantin
Asian Games medalists in shooting
Shooters at the 1962 Asian Games
Prateep Polphantin
Medalists at the 1962 Asian Games
Prateep Polphantin